Persatuan Sepakbola Indonesia Mutiara (formerly known as Persimura Beureunuen) is an Indonesian football club based in Beureunuen, Mutiara District, Pidie Regency, Aceh. They currently compete in the Liga 3.

References

Football clubs in Indonesia
Football clubs in Aceh
Association football clubs established in 1989
1989 establishments in Indonesia